Indian Hills Resort, formerly called Indian Hills State Recreation Area and Resort, is a commercially operated resort on the north shore of Lake Sakakawea located  west of Garrison, North Dakota. The resort offers camping, lodging, boating, fishing, and trails for hiking and biking.

References

External links
Indian Hills Resort

McLean County, North Dakota
McLean